The following is a list of the Most Valuable Players in the Soviet ice hockey league, which existed from 1946 to 1991 .



Award winners

1967-68   Anatoli Firsov
1968-69   Anatoli Firsov
1969-70   Viktor Konovalenko
1970-71   Anatoli Firsov
1971-72   Valeri Kharlamov/Alexander Maltsev
1972-73   Valeri Kharlamov
1973-74   Vladislav Tretiak
1974-75   Vladislav Tretiak
1975-76   Vladislav Tretiak
1976-77   Helmut Balderis
1977-78   Boris Mikhailov
1978-79   Boris Mikhailov
1979-80   Sergei Makarov
1980-81   Vladislav Tretiak
1981-82   Viacheslav Fetisov
1982-83   Vladislav Tretiak
1983-84   Nikolai Drozdetsky
1984-85   Sergei Makarov
1985-86   Vyacheslav Fetisov
1986-87   Vladimir Krutov
1987-88   Igor Larionov
1988-89   Sergei Makarov
1989-90   Andrei Khomutov
1990-91   Valeri Kamensky

Most awards
Vladislav Tretiak - 5
Anatoli Firsov - 3
Sergei Makarov - 3

See also
Russian Elite Hockey Scoring Champion
Russian Elite Hockey Goal Scoring Champion

Sources
CCCP Hockey International

Ice hockey in the Soviet Union
Russian ice hockey trophies and awards
Ice hockey player of the year awards